Bulls is a small town north west of Palmerston North on the west coast of the North Island of New Zealand. It is in a fertile farming area in the Rangitikei District at the junction of State Highways 1 and 3 about 135 kilometres (84 mi) north of Wellington. According to a  Statistics New Zealand estimate, Bulls has a population of  inhabitants.

Recent marketing makes puns with the name, for example, "New Zealand gets its milk from Bulls" or the sign for the local police station "Const-a-bull".

Etymology

There are two recorded Māori toponyms for the area – Te Ara Taumaihi and Ō-hine-puhiawe. The origins of Te Ara Taumaihi have yet to be explicitly explored. Ō-hine-puhiawe, a land block where Parewahawaha marae is situated, acts as a synecdoche to refer to the current town area. The modern town name is named after James Bull who owned the first general store there. The town was originally called Bull Town, but this was changed to Clifton and then renamed back to Bulls at the urging of Sir William Fox.

History and culture

The eastern end of the State Highway 1 bridge over the Rangitikei River south-east of the town collapsed suddenly in 1973 while being crossed by a bus. No-one was killed and the collapsed part was rebuilt.

The former Lake Alice Psychiatric hospital is 7 km (4 mi) north of Bulls, the hospital closed in 1999. Lake Alice was a large contributor to the Bulls and Marton economy.

Bulls is covered by the Whanganui Chronicle, a daily paper part of the NZ Herald network that serves the Whanganui, Ruapehu and Rangitīkei regions.

Marae

The local Parewahawaha Marae is a traditional meeting ground for the Ngāti Raukawa hapū of Ngāti Parewahawaha. It is on land known as Ohinepuhiawe.

The marae features the Parewahawaha meeting house, a whare tupana opened on 15 April 1967 by Maori Queen Te Atairangikaahu. At the time it was opened, Te Rangi Pumamao was the rangatira at Parewahawaha. He had finished construction of the house, as previous builders had died.

In October 2020, the Government committed $1,248,067 from the Provincial Growth Fund to upgrade the marae and 5 others, creating 69 jobs.

Demographics

There were 693 households. There were 972 males and 963 females, giving a sex ratio of 1.01 males per female. The median age was 32.2 years (compared with 37.4 years nationally), with 477 people (24.7%) aged under 15 years, 426 (22.0%) aged 15 to 29, 759 (39.2%) aged 30 to 64, and 276 (14.3%) aged 65 or older.

Ethnicities were 78.1% European/Pākehā, 27.3% Māori, 7.8% Pacific peoples, 3.1% Asian, and 2.6% other ethnicities (totals add to more than 100% since people could identify with multiple ethnicities).

The proportion of people born overseas was 14.9%, compared with 27.1% nationally.

Although some people objected to giving their religion, 54.1% had no religion, 33.0% were Christian, 0.6% were Hindu, 0.2% were Muslim, 0.3% were Buddhist and 3.9% had other religions.

Of those at least 15 years old, 144 (9.9%) people had a bachelor or higher degree, and 321 (22.0%) people had no formal qualifications. The median income was $31,000, compared with $31,800 nationally. The employment status of those at least 15 was that 747 (51.2%) people were employed full-time, 171 (11.7%) were part-time, and 60 (4.1%) were unemployed.

Government and politics

Local government

As part of the Rangitikei District, the current Mayor of Rangitikei since 2013 is Andy Watson.

Bulls is the main town in the Southern ward of the Rangitikei District Council, which elects three of the eleven district councillors. The three councillors of the Southern ward are Brian Carter, Jane Dunn and Waru Panapa. The mayor and councillors are all due for re-election in October 2022.

National government
Bulls, like the rest of the Rangitikei District, is located in the general electorate of Rangitīkei and the Māori electorate of Te Tai Hauāuru. Rangitīkei is a safe National Party seat since the 1938 election except for 1978–1984 when it was held by Bruce Beetham of the Social Credit Party. Since 2011 it has been held by Ian McKelvie.

Te Tai Hauāuru is a more unstable seat, having been held by three different parties since 1996, i.e. New Zealand First, the Māori Party and the Labour Party. Since 2014 it has been held by Adrian Rurawhe of the Labour Party.

Military presence
Many Air Force personnel from RNZAF Base Ohakea live in Bulls. In recent years several defence houses have been sold to civilian buyers which has seen a steady decline of servicemen from the area, but a moderate presence remains nonetheless.

In 2017 it was announced that the Republic of Singapore Air Force is looking at establishing a permanent F-15 fighter jet training base at Ohakea with an estimated presence of 500 Singaporean personnel. Ohakea and surrounding areas such as Bulls and Feilding would see a significant increase in military families and personnel to the area. In December 2018 it was announced that this would no longer go ahead.

In 2018 the incumbent government announced the purchase of four Boeing P-8 Poseidon aircraft for maritime surveillance. This announcement came with the news that the current New Zealand Defence Force unit responsible for maritime surveillance, No. 5 Squadron RNZAF, would be required to move to RNZAF Base Ohakea. This move would see a further increase in the number of service personnel living in the area. RNZAF is expected to take delivery of these aircraft in 2023.

Education 

Bulls has two co-educational state primary schools for Year 1–8 students.

Sister city
The town's sister city is Cowes, England.

Notable people
 Chris Amon, former Formula One driver between 1963–1976
 Travis Banks, professional wrestler
 Ormond Wilson, politician
 Victoria Ransom, entrepreneur

References

External links

Unforgetabull

Populated places in Manawatū-Whanganui
Rangitikei District
Populated places on the Rangitīkei River